Pleiospilos is a genus of succulent flowering plants of the family Aizoaceae, native to South Africa. The name is derived from the Greek pleios "many" and spìlos "spot". The plants are also known as kwaggavy ("Quagga mesemb"), lewerplant ("liver plant"), lewervygie ("liver mesemb"), klipplant ("stone plant"), split rock or mimicry plant.

Pleiospilos species have two or four opposite, very fleshy, grey-green leaves growing from a short stem that may be underground. The leaves, with their hemispherical shape and pitted texture, often strongly resemble a pile of split pebbles to deter predators. Flowers emerge from the center of the leaves, and may be very big in relation to the overall size of the plant.

They reproduce both sexually and asexually. Vegetative offshoots emerge from the root system. Seed set occurs in early spring around March.

The species P. bolusii and  P. nelii are cultivated as ornamentals.

Species 
 Pleiospilos bolusii
 Pleiospilos compactus
 P. compactus subsp. compactus
 P. compactus subsp. canus
 P. compactus subsp. minor
 P. compactus subsp. fergusoniae
 P. compactus subsp. sororius
 Pleiospilos nelii
 Pleiospilos simulans

References

 
Aizoaceae genera
Flora of South Africa
Taxa named by N. E. Brown
Succulent plants